is the thirteenth single by L'Arc-en-Ciel. It was released simultaneously with "Honey" and "Kasou" on July 8, 1998. The single reached number 2 on the Oricon chart. It was re-released on August 30, 2006.

The song was used briefly in the background of the American film Godzilla and was included on the Philippines release and Japanese edition of the soundtrack Godzilla: The Album. "Lose Control" became the #20 single of 1998 in Japan, where it sold 938,401 copies.

Track listing 

* Remix by Yukihiro.

Covers 
Fantôme Iris, a fictional visual kei band from multimedia franchise Argonavis from BanG Dream! covered the song on their first solo live Fantôme Iris 1st LIVE -C'est la vie!-.

References

1998 singles
L'Arc-en-Ciel songs
Songs written by Hyde (musician)
Songs written by Ken (musician)
1998 songs
Ki/oon Music singles